Louis Maillard may refer to:

 Louis Maillard (astronomer) (1867–1938), French-born Swiss astronomer
 Louis Camille Maillard (1878–1936), French physician and chemist